Ronald L. Rice (December 18, 1945 – March 15, 2023) was an American Democratic Party politician who served in the New Jersey State Senate from 1986 to 2022. He represented the 28th Legislative District. Rice is one of the longest-serving state senators in New Jersey history.

Early life 
Rice received an A.S. from Essex County College in Police Science, a B.S. from John Jay College of Criminal Justice in Administration and Planning,  and an M.A. from Rutgers University in Criminal Justice. He has also attended but never graduated from the Rutgers School of Law—Newark. He served as a Sergeant in the U.S. Marines from 1966 to 1970, in the Vietnam War. Before entering politics, Rice was a police officer with the Newark Police Department for eight years, then a security employee for PSE&G.

Newark City Council 
Rice served 16 years on the Newark City Council (1982-1998), and he was the Deputy Mayor of Newark from 2002 until March 2006. He stepped down as deputy mayor in order to run for mayor. As dual office holding was not banned in New Jersey, he was able to serve on both the city council and in the State Senate at the same time.

New Jersey Senate 
Following the death of John P. Caufield in August 1986, Rice was elected in a special election to serve the 28th district and was seated on December 4, 1986. He never received less than two thirds of the vote in any of his Senate general elections, though he faced close challenges in the Democratic primaries from Laurence Brown in 1997, Assemblyman Willie B. Brown in 2001, and Freeholder D. Bilal Beasley in 2007. He was one of only two Democrats in the Senate to vote no on two bills to legalize same-sex marriage in New Jersey in 2009 and 2012, the other twice-dissenting Democrat was Jeff Van Drew. Rice was one of New Jersey's presidential electors in the 2004 presidential election, for Democratic candidate John Kerry. He was a leading opponent of legislation in the 218th New Jersey Legislature to legalize marijuana in New Jersey, arguing that legalization would force urban neighborhoods to "struggle against the spread of 'marijuana bodegas' disguised as dispensaries".

Committees 
Committee assignments for the current session (until his resignation on August 31, 2022) are:
Community and Urban Affairs, Vice-Chair
Joint Committee on Housing Affordability
Joint Committee on Economic Justice and Equal Employment Opportunities
Joint Committee on the Public Schools
Health, Human Services and Senior Citizens

District 28 
Each of the 40 districts in the New Jersey Legislature has one representative in the New Jersey Senate and two members in the New Jersey General Assembly. The representatives from the 28th District for the 2022—23 Legislative Session are:
 Senator Ronald Rice  (D)
 Assemblyman Ralph Caputo  (D)
 Assemblywoman Cleopatra Tucker  (D)

Newark mayoral bids

1998 
Rice had run unsuccessfully for Mayor of Newark in 1998 being defeated by incumbent mayor (and future Senate colleague) Sharpe James, who won with 56% of the vote; Rice was in second, with 28%.

2006 
On March 6, 2006, Rice entered the mayoral race again, noting "that Mayor James had encouraged him to run but noted that if the mayor decided to join the race, his candidacy could change." On March 27, 2006, James announced that he would not seek a sixth term, preferring to focus on his seat in the New Jersey Senate. On Election Day, May 9, 2006, Newark's nonpartisan election took place. Former City Councilman Cory Booker won with 72% of the vote, soundly defeating Rice, the runner-up, who received 23%.

Personal life and death 
Rice left office on August 31, 2022, due to health issues. He died on March 15, 2023 in Newark, New Jersey. He was 77.

His son, Ronald C. Rice, is a former city councilman in Newark, New Jersey.

References

External links
Senator Rice's legislative web page, New Jersey Legislature
New Jersey Legislature financial disclosure forms
2016 2015 2014 2013 2012 2011 2010 2009 2008 2007 2006 2005 2004

“The Writing on the Wall” New Jersey Network, The Walter J. Brown Media Archives & Peabody Awards Collection at the University of Georgia, American Archive of Public Broadcasting

1945 births
2023 deaths
African-American state legislators in New Jersey
Essex County College alumni
John Jay College of Criminal Justice alumni
Democratic Party New Jersey state senators
Politicians from Richmond, Virginia
Rutgers University alumni
2004 United States presidential electors
21st-century American politicians
United States Marine Corps personnel of the Vietnam War
Members of the Municipal Council of Newark
African-American city council members in New Jersey
20th-century African-American people
21st-century African-American politicians